John Smith (born 1952, Walthamstow, England) is a British avant garde filmmaker noted for his use of humour in exploring various themes that often play upon the film spectator's conditioned assumptions of the medium.

His film The Girl Chewing Gum has been called one of the most important avant-garde films of the 20th century.

Biography 
John Smith studied film at the Royal College of Art. After graduating in 1977 he became involved in the activities of the London Filmmakers’ Co-op.  Strongly influenced by conceptual art and the structural materialist ideas which dominated British artists' filmmaking at that time, but also fascinated by the immersive power of narrative and the spoken word, he has developed a body of work which reworks and transforms reality, playfully exploring and exposing the language of cinema.

Since 1972 John Smith has made over fifty film, video and installation works that have been shown in cinemas, art galleries and on television around the world and awarded major prizes at many international film festivals including Oberhausen Short Film Festival; Cork Film Festival; Leipzig Festival for Documentary and Animated Film; 'Punto de Vista' Documentary Festival, Pamplona; Hamburg Short Film Festival; Ann Arbor Film Festival; Uppsala Short Film Festival and Biennial of Moving Images, Geneva. His solo exhibitions include Tanya Leighton, Berlin (2017, 2015, 2013, 2012 and 2010), Alma Zevi, Venice (2017), Kate MacGarry, London (2016), Wolverhampton Art Gallery (2016), Museum of Contemporary Art, Leipzig (2015), La Galerie, Noisy-le-Sec, Paris (2014), Kestnergesellschaft, Hannover (2012), Turner Contemporary, Margate (2012), Weserburg Museum of Contemporary Art, Bremen (2012), Uppsala Art Museum (2011), Sala Diaz Gallery, San Antonio, Texas (2010), Ikon Gallery, Birmingham (2006), Kunstmuseum Magdeburg (2005), Open Eye Gallery, Liverpool (2003) and Pearl Gallery, London (2003). A major retrospective exhibition of his work encompassing work from 1972 to 2010 curated by the graduating students of the Royal College of Art Curating Contemporary Art Course took place in spring 2010 at the RCA Galleries. Smith regularly presents his work in person and in recent years it has been profiled through retrospectives at the 2007 Venice Biennale and film festivals in Oberhausen, Cork, Tampere, St. Petersburg, Mexico City, Uppsala, Sarajevo, Vilnius, Prizren, Bristol, Munich, Regensburg, Karlstad, Lussas and La Rochelle.

John Smith lives and works in London. He is Professor Emeritus of Fine Art at University of East London. In 2011 he received a Paul Hamlyn Foundation Award for Artists and in 2013 he was the winner of Film London’s Jarman Award. His work is held in numerous collections including Arts Council England; Tate Gallery; Museum of Modern Art, New York; Muzeum Sztuki, Lodz; Ella Fontanals-Cisneros, Miami; Kunstmuseum Magdeburg; Ferens Art Gallery, Hull and Wolverhampton Art Gallery.

Selected filmography 
Associations (1975)
The Girl Chewing Gum (1976)
Hackney Marshes - November 4th 1977 (1977)
Shepherd's Delight (1984)
Om (1986)
The Black Tower (1987)
Slow Glass (1991)
Blight (1996)
The Kiss (1999)
Regression (1999)
Lost Sound (2001)
Worst Case Scenario (2003)
Hotel Diaries (2001-7)
Flag Mountain (2010)
unusual Red cardigan (2011)
The Man Phoning Mum (2011)
Dad's Stick (2012)
White Hole (2014)
Steve Hates Fish (2015)
Who Are We? (2016)
Song for Europe (2017)
A State of Grace (2019)
Citadel (2020)
Covid Messages (2020)

References

External links
 Official website
 An essay on Smith's film 'The Girl Chewing Gum' on Tate website
 An essay on Smith from Idiom magazine
 An interview with Smith from Sight & Sound magazine

1952 births
Living people
English film directors
English experimental filmmakers
Academics of the University of East London